Barlovci is a village in the municipality of Banja Luka, Republika Srpska, Bosnia and Herzegovina.

Demographics 
Ethnic groups in the village include:
677 Serbs (95.22%)
20 Croats (2.81%)
14 Others (1.97%)

References

Villages in Republika Srpska
Populated places in Banja Luka